The 2016 Alabama Republican presidential primary took place on March 1, 2016. This was the fifth primary held in the 2016 Republican primary. Donald Trump won the primary handily. The election was also held on Super Tuesday. Trump eventually won the Republican primary. He was elected President of the United States on November 8, 2016, against Hillary Clinton. 

Ahead of the primary, Alabama was considered one of Donald Trump's strongest states. Trump enjoyed the endorsement of Senator Jeff Sessions, who would later join his Department of Justice as Attorney General. Sessions was Trump's first endorsement in the U.S. Senate.

Candidates 
 Donald Trump
 Ted Cruz
 Marco Rubio
 John Kasich
 Ben Carson

Endorsements

Polling

Aggregate polls

Results

Results by county

Analysis 
According to Pew Research, Alabama's Republican electorate has the second-highest proportion of white Evangelicals of any Super Tuesday state, at 63% of Republican voters. 

Donald Trump won the Alabama primary in a landslide due to support from Evangelical primary voters. Trump carried 43% of Evangelicals compared to 22% for Ted Cruz, according to exit polls by Edison Research. Many pundits were perplexed by Trump's dominance among culturally conservative Southern whites who were expected to view him as immoral, but he benefitted from voters' racial, cultural, and economic angst that mattered more than shared values.

References

Alabama
Republican presidential primary
Alabama Republican primaries
March 2016 events in the United States